Cristina Sánchez de Pablos (born 20 February 1972) is a Spanish bullfighter who gained prominence during the 1990s for being one of the first female bullfighters. She is the first woman to complete her alternativa in Europe.

Career
Cristina Sánchez de Pablos was born on 20 February 1972 in Madrid, Spain. She was a professional bullfighter at bullrings in Ecuador and Mexico and undertook many presentations and demonstrations in Spain. She debuted as a bullfighter in Madrid on 13 February 1993.  She retired in 1999 and married the Portuguese banderillero Alexandre da Silva in 2000.

Sánchez was considered by some to be a representative of the feminist movement of the 1990s, as bullfighting is typically a male-dominated activity. She was also the subject of the Univision TV news program Primer Impacto, where Maria Celeste Arraras presented an article about her.

See also

 List of female bullfighters

References

Further reading
 "Cristina Sánchez (bullfigher)", in Outstanding Women Athletes: Who They Are and How They Influenced Sports in America by Janet Woolum (Phoenix: Oryx Press, 1998), pp. 214–215

External links

 
 
 

1972 births
Living people
Sportspeople from Madrid
Spanish bullfighters
Female bullfighters
Spanish feminists